Hum Tum Aur Woh may refer to:

 Hum Tum Aur Woh (1938 film), a Hindi/Urdu social drama film directed by Mehboob Khan
 Hum Tum Aur Woh (1971 film), a Bollywood drama directed by Shiv Kumar